Lü Qin (born 10 August 1962) is one of the world's best players in Xiangqi (Chinese chess).

Lü Qin's major achievements in Xiangqi include the following:
 Winner of Chinese National Xiangqi Individual Championship in 1986, 1988, 1999, 2003 and 2004.
 Starter in the championship winning team of Guangdong in the Chinese National Xiangqi League in 1989, 1993, 1999, 2000, 2001, 2002, 2004 and 2006.
 Winner of Asian Xiangqi Individual Championship in 1985.
 Starter in the championship winning team of China in the World Xiangqi Championship in 1990, 1995, 1997, 2001 and 2005.
 Winner of the World Xiangqi Individual Championship in 1990, 1995, 1997, 2001 and 2005.

Personal life 
Lü Qin was born in Huiyang, Guangdong, China, in 1962. Lü belongs to the Hoklo dialect group. Lu is married to Xu Miaoling, another Xiangqi player on the Guangdong team.

References

1962 births
Living people
Xiangqi players
People from Huizhou
Sportspeople from Guangdong
Xiangqi players at the 2010 Asian Games
Asian Games medalists in xiangqi
Asian Games bronze medalists for China
Medalists at the 2010 Asian Games